

Offseason 
 Prior to 1943 season (exact date unknown)
Sherm Lollar was signed as an amateur free agent by the Indians.
Pete Milne was signed as an amateur free agent by the Indians.

Regular season

Season standings

Record vs. opponents

Roster

Player stats

Batting

Starters by position 
Note: Pos = Position; G = Games played; AB = At bats; H = Hits; Avg. = Batting average; HR = Home runs; RBI = Runs batted in

Other batters 

Note: G = Games played; AB = At bats; H = Hits; Avg. = Batting average; HR = Home runs; RBI = Runs batted in

Pitching

Starting pitchers 
Note: G = Games pitched; IP = Innings pitched; W = Wins; L = Losses; ERA = Earned run average; SO = Strikeouts

Other pitchers 
Note: G = Games pitched; IP = Innings pitched; W = Wins; L = Losses; ERA = Earned run average; SO = Strikeouts

Relief pitchers 

Note: G = Games pitched; W = Wins; L = Losses; SV = Saves; ERA = Earned run average; SO = Strikeouts

Awards and honors 

All-Star Game

Lou Boudreau, Shortstop

Roy Cullenbine, Outfielder

Oris Hockett, Outfielder

Ken Keltner, Third baseman (starter)

Farm system

References

External links
1943 Cleveland Indians at Baseball Reference
1943 Cleveland Indians at Baseball Almanac

Cleveland Indians seasons
Cleveland Indians season
Cleveland Indians